Major General Norman Elliot Rodger,  (1907 – 15 September 2010) was a senior Canadian Army officer.

Born in Amherst, Nova Scotia in 1907, Rodger was educated at the Royal Military College of Canada and McGill University. He was commissioned into the Royal Canadian Engineers in 1928.

In 1942 he was appointed commander of the 10th Canadian Infantry Brigade.

In retirement he served as the chairman of the Manitoba Liquor Commission from 1959 to 1969. From 1965 to 1970 he was Colonel Commandant of the Cadet Services of Canada.

References

External links
Generals of World War II

1907 births
2010 deaths
Foreign recipients of the Legion of Merit
People from Amherst, Nova Scotia
Royal Military College of Canada alumni
McGill University alumni
Canadian generals
Canadian Commanders of the Order of the British Empire
Commanders of the Order of Orange-Nassau
Commanders of the Legion of Merit
Canadian Army personnel of World War II
Graduates of the Staff College, Camberley
Graduates of the Royal College of Defence Studies
Canadian centenarians
Men centenarians
Royal Canadian Engineers officers
Canadian military personnel from Nova Scotia